A camera operator, or depending on the context cameraman or camerawoman, is a professional operator of a film camera or video camera as part of a film crew. The term "cameraman" does not imply that a male is performing the task.

In filmmaking, the cinematographer or director of photography (DP or DoP) is sometimes called lighting cameraman or first cameraman. The DP may operate the camera themselves, or enlist the aid of a camera operator or second cameraman to operate it or set the controls. The first assistant cameraman (1st AC), also known as a focus puller, is responsible for maintenance of the camera, such as clearing dirt from the film gate and adjusting the follow focus. A second assistant cameraman (2nd AC), also known as a clapper loader, might be employed to load film, slate scenes, or maintain the camera report (a log of scenes, takes, rolls, photographic filters used, and other production data).

As of 2016, there were approximately 59,300 television, video, and motion picture camera operators employed in the United States.

Important camera operator skills include choreographing and framing shots, knowledge of and the ability to select appropriate camera lenses, and other equipment (dollies, camera cranes, etc.) to portray dramatic scenes. The principles of dramatic story telling and film editing fundamentals are also important skills. The camera operator is required to communicate clearly and concisely on sets where time and film budget constraints are ever present.

References

Broadcasting occupations
Cinematography
Filmmaking occupations
Television terminology
Television occupations